The 1922 Campeonato Gaúcho was the fourth season of Rio Grande do Sul's top association football league. Grêmio won their second title. This was the last season played before the Federalist Revolution suspended play until 1925.

Format 

The championship was contested by the four regional champions in a single round-robin system, with the team with the most points winning the title. If two teams finished with the same number of points, a tie-breaking match would be played.

Qualified teams 

Ideal were eliminated in the South Region Championship.
FC Montenegro were eliminated in the Center Region Championship.
14 de Julho from Passo Fundo were eliminated in the Highlands Region Championship.

Championship

Tie-breaking matches

References 

Campeonato Gaúcho seasons
1922 in Brazilian football leagues